The Nome Kingdom is a fictional region near the Land of Oz that is ruled by the Nome King. It is near the Land of Ev, Rinkitink, and the unnamed countries where Whimsies, Growleywogs and Phanfasms live. The Nome Kingdom is also known as the Dominions of the Nome King.

History
The Nome Kingdom is located underground and beneath the mountains that are north of the Land of Ev, and was first seen in L. Frank Baum's 1907 novel Ozma of Oz.

There are no trees or small animals in the Nome Kingdom and they only contain bare mountains. Inside the mountains are vast caverns which extend for miles and miles. Thousands of Nomes work at furnaces and forges, hammering precious metals or polishing jewels.

In Ozma of Oz, the Queen of Ev and her children were once sold to the Nome King who transformed them into items of Bric-a-brac and placed them in his palace. Princess Ozma  and Dorothy Gale arrived with a contingent from the Emerald City expecting to rescue the Queen of Ev, though she and nearly all her party were transformed into ornaments as well before being rescued by Billina.

In The Emerald City of Oz, the Nome King allied himself with the Whimsies, the Phanfasms, and the Growleywogs where they lead the Nome Kingdom's army into tunneling under the Deadly Desert as part of a plot to invade the Land of Oz. Upon emerging in the Emerald City, his forces drank from the Forbidden Fountain, forgot everything, and were returned to their respective locations.

Reception
Ozma's relationship with the Nome Kingdom has been discussed as an example of imperialism in English literature.

Points of interest
 Great Domed Cavern - The largest cave in the Nome Kingdom.
 Metal Forest - An artificial forest in the Great Domed Cavern. This is where the Nomes store their riches. All the trees are solid gold and tower as high as oak trees. The Metal Forest also has Hotel Trees which bear edible food.
 Hot Lake - An unnamed hot bubbling lake where the Nomes like to go swimming.
 Nome King's Palace - The home of the Nome King.
 Rubber Country - An area of land that is near the Nome Kingdom and the Land of Ev. Everything there is all rubbery and is surrounded by a brook of dry water.

Known inhabitants
 Colonel Crinkle - A dapper-looking Nome who is the colonel of the Nome Army. He temporarily became General after General Blug was disposed of. After an argument with the Nome King, General Crinkle was taken to the torture chamber where he was sliced thin and fed to a bunch of Seven-Headed Dogs.
 General Blug - A Nome who is the general of the Nome Army. He was the one who suggested that the Nome King have his forces tunnel under the Deadly Desert. Upon an argument involving Princess Ozma's powers, Nome King knocked General Blug unconscious and had him thrown away.
 General Guph - An old Nome who was the successor of General Blug and Colonel Crinkle. Guph was the one who enlisted the Whimsies, the Phanfasms, and the Growleywogs into joining the Nome King in his invasion upon the Land of Oz. After Ruggedo was overthrown by Kaliko, Guph was made the new Chamberlain.
 Iron Giant - A mechanical construct created by Smith & Tinker for the Nome King. It is used to keep trespassers into locating the Nome King's palace. The Iron Giant once stepped on Sawhorse. It was later stopped by Dorothy using the Magic Belt.
 Long-Eared Hearer - A Nome with large ears. He can hear people on the surface or people over 9,306 miles down the Hollow Tube.
 Lookout - A strange Nome who had the power to see many things with his eyes that went in different directions.
 Kaliko - A Nome who was Ruggedo's Chamberlain. He later became the second Nome King after Ruggedo was overthrown.
 Klik -
 Pang - A Nome who is the leader of the Nome King's executioners.
 Potaroo - The Nome's residential fifth-rate wizard.
 Ruggedo - The original Nome King.
 Quiggeroc - An old Nome who served Kaliko during his time as the Nome King.
 Shoofenwaller - Chamberlain under Kaliko
 Umph and Grumph -

In other media
 The Nome Kingdom appears in Return to Oz.

 The Nome Kingdom appears in Dorothy and the Wizard of Oz. The Nome Kingdom is shown to be beneath the Land of Ev.

 The Nome Kingdom appears in Tom and Jerry: Back to Oz. This version is shown to be beneath the Land of Oz. It also contains the Pit of Nome Return because no Nome that has fallen into was ever seen coming out of it.

References

External links
 Nome Kingdom at Comic Vine

Fictional elements introduced in 1907
Oz countries
Fictional subterranea
Fictional kingdoms